Barsaman Pun, also known by his nom de guerre Ananta, is a Nepali communist politician and former Minister for Energy, Water Resources and Irrigation. He is also a member of the Standing Committee in Nepal Communist Party (NCP). He has previously served as Minister of Finance and Minister of Peace and Reconstruction. He was a leader of the Communist Party of Nepal (Maoist-Centre) during the insurgency period and served as one of 4 deputy commanders of People's Liberation Army.

Insurgency
He commanded the attack on Holeri police station on February 13, 1996, which marked the beginning of the civil war. He was appointed as Eastern divisional commander following the 2002 central committee meeting. Some of the battles he commanded in this capacity include the attack at Bhiman, Sindhuli in September 2002 which led to the death of 49 policemen and the attack on Bandipur barracks in May 2005. He was appointed as a deputy commander of People's Liberation Army at the Chunbang conference in 2005.

Political career
Following the Second People's movement and Comprehensive Peace Accord, Pun transitioned into politics. He was elected to the first Constituent assembly from Lalitpur-1. He contested the second Constituent assembly from Morang in line with the party policy of top Maoist leaders to contest the election from the Terai belt. However, he came in third place behind then Congress District Chairman Dik Bahadur Limbu and CPN-UML candidate Ghanashyam Khatiwada. He contested the 2017 House of Representatives election from his home district, Rolpa, and was elected to Parliament.

MCC Compact
MCC began developing the compact at the request of Nepal in 2012 when Baburam Bhattarai was prime minister and Barsaman Pun was finance minister of Nepal.

The compact was taken to parliament for ratification on 15 July 2019 when KP Sharma Oli was prime minister and Barsaman Pun was energy minister of Nepal.

Electoral history
2008 Constituent Assembly election

Lalitpur - 1

2013 Constituent Assembly election

Morang - 9

2017 House of Representatives Election

Rolpa

Personal life
He is married to Onsari Gharti Magar, a fellow communist politician and former speaker of the Legislature-Parliament.

References

Finance ministers of Nepal
Living people
Communist Party of Nepal (Maoist Centre) politicians
Nepal Communist Party (NCP) politicians
Nepal MPs 2017–2022
People of the Nepalese Civil War
People from Rolpa District
Members of the 1st Nepalese Constituent Assembly
1971 births
Nepal MPs 2022–present